is a Japanese retired ice hockey player. She played with the Japanese women's national ice hockey team during 2000 to 2016 and holds the record for most games played with the national team. She represented Japan in the women's ice hockey tournament at the 2014 Winter Olympics in Sochi and in ten IIHF Women's World Championships –  five at the Top Division level, three at the Division I level, and two at the Division I A level.

References

External links 

 
 

1987 births
Living people
Japanese women's ice hockey forwards
People from Matsusaka, Mie
AIK Hockey Dam players
Japanese expatriate sportspeople in Sweden
Naisten Liiga (ice hockey) players
Japanese expatriate sportspeople in Finland
Ice hockey players at the 2014 Winter Olympics
Olympic ice hockey players of Japan
Asian Games medalists in ice hockey
Medalists at the 2003 Asian Winter Games
Medalists at the 2007 Asian Winter Games
Medalists at the 2011 Asian Winter Games
Ice hockey players at the 2003 Asian Winter Games
Ice hockey players at the 2007 Asian Winter Games
Ice hockey players at the 2011 Asian Winter Games

Asian Games silver medalists for Japan